Tariel Zharkymbaev (born 17 September 1996) is a Kyrgyzstani cross-country skier. He competed in the 2018 Winter Olympics.

References

External links
 

1996 births
Living people
Cross-country skiers at the 2018 Winter Olympics
Kyrgyzstani male cross-country skiers
Olympic cross-country skiers of Kyrgyzstan
Biathletes at the 2017 Asian Winter Games
Cross-country skiers at the 2017 Asian Winter Games